Alvan (also Romanized as Alvān) is a village in Daran Rural District, in the Central District of Jolfa County, East Azerbaijan Province, Iran. At the 2006 census, its population was 74, in 24 families.

References 

Populated places in Jolfa County